Ghotana is a village and deh in Hyderabad taluka of Hyderabad District, Sindh. As of 2017, it has a population of 2,639, in 544 households. It is part of the tapedar circle of Hussain Khan Thoro.

References 

Populated places in Hyderabad District, Pakistan